Bay View High School can refer to several different schools:

 Bay View High School (HRM)
 Bay View High School (Karachi)
 Bay View High School (Milwaukee, WI)